The black-throated sunbird (Aethopyga saturata) is a species of bird in the family Nectariniidae.

It is found in the Indian subcontinent and adjoining regions of Southeast Asia, ranging across Bangladesh, Bhutan, Cambodia, China, India, Laos, Malaysia, Myanmar, Nepal, Thailand and Vietnam.

Its natural habitats are subtropical or tropical moist lowland forest and subtropical or tropical moist montane forest.

References

External links

black-throated sunbird
Birds of the Himalayas
Birds of Northeast India
Birds of Southeast Asia
Birds of Yunnan
black-throated sunbird
Taxonomy articles created by Polbot